Gronk may refer to:

People
 Rob Gronkowski (born 1989), National Football League player
 Jordan Staal (born 1988), National Hockey League player
 Gronk (artist) (born 1957), Glugio Nicandro

Characters

Comics
 Gronk (comics), a supervillain in the Marvel Comics universe
 Gronk, a webcomic by Katie Cook
 The Gronk, a supporting character in the 2000 AD series Strontium Dog
 A dinosaur character in the comic series B.C.

Television
 A character on The Hilarious House of Frightenstein
 A character on It's About Time
 A character on The Ghost Busters

Video games
 A character in Hyperball Racing
 Lt. Gronk, in Sly Cooper

Other uses
 A nickname for the British Rail Class 08, diesel locomotive
 GrOnk, a Canadian concrete poetry magazine active from 1967 to 1988
 "The Gronk", a track on the album Light On by Tom Harrell

See also
 Gronkh (born 1977), German YouTube personality